This article incorporates text from the Silvics of North America, freely licensed as a work of the US Fed. Govt.

Larix laricina, commonly known as the tamarack, hackmatack, eastern larch, black larch, red larch, or American larch, is a species of larch native to Canada, from eastern Yukon and Inuvik, Northwest Territories east to Newfoundland, and also south into the upper northeastern United States from Minnesota to Cranesville Swamp, West Virginia; there is also an isolated population in central Alaska. The word akemantak is an Algonquian name for the species and means "wood used for snowshoes".

Description 
Tamaracks and larches (Larix species) are deciduous conifers. The bark is tight and flaky, pink, but under flaking bark it can appear reddish. The leaves are needle-like,  short, light blue-green, turning bright yellow before they fall in the autumn, leaving the pale pinkish-brown shoots bare until the next spring. The needles are produced spirally on long shoots and in dense clusters on long woody spur shoots.

Key characteristics:
 The needles are normally borne on a short shoot in groups of 10–20 needles.
 The larch is deciduous and the needles turn yellow in autumn.
 Larch are commonly found in swamps, fens, bogs, and other low-land areas.

Distribution and ecology 

Tamaracks are very cold tolerant, able to survive temperatures down to at least , and commonly occurs at the Arctic tree line at the edge of the tundra. They can tolerate a wide range of soil conditions but grow most commonly in swamps, bogs, or muskegs, in wet to moist organic soils such as sphagnum, peat, and woody peat. They are also found on mineral soils that range from heavy clay to coarse sand; thus texture does not seem to be limiting. Although tamarack can grow well on calcareous soils, it is not abundant on the limestone areas of eastern Ontario.

Tamarack is generally the first forest tree to grow on filled-lake bogs. In the lake states, tamarack may appear first in the sedge mat, sphagnum moss, or not until the bog shrub stage. Farther north, it is the pioneer tree in the bog shrub stage. Tamarack is fairly well adapted to reproduce successfully on burns, so it is one of the common pioneers on sites in the boreal forest immediately after a fire.

Associated forest cover 

Tamarack forms extensive pure stands in the boreal region of Canada and in northern Minnesota. In the rest of its United States range and in the Maritime Provinces, tamarack is found locally in both pure and mixed stands. It is a major component in the Society of American Foresters (SAF) forest cover types Tamarack and black spruce–tamarack.

Black spruce (Picea mariana) is usually tamarack's main associate in mixed stands on all sites. The other most common associates include balsam fir (Abies balsamea), white spruce (Picea glauca), and quaking aspen (Populus tremuloides) in the boreal region. In the better organic soil sites in the northern forest region, the most common associates are the northern white-cedar (Thuja occidentalis), balsam fir, black ash (Fraxinus nigra), and red maple (Acer rubrum). In Alaska, quaking aspen and tamarack are almost never found together. Additional common associates are American elm (Ulmus americana), balsam poplar (Populus balsamifera), jack pine (Pinus banksiana), paper birch (Betula papyrifera), Kenai birch (B. papyrifera var. kenaica), and yellow birch (B. alleghaniensis).

Tamarack stands cast light shade and so usually have a dense undergrowth of shrubs and herbs. Because the tree has an extensive range, a great variety of shrubs is associated with it. Dominant tall shrubs include dwarf and swamp birch (Betula glandulosa and Betula pumila), willows (Salix spp.), speckled alder (Alnus rugosa), and red-osier dogwood (Cornus stolonifera). Low shrubs include bog Labrador tea (Ledum groenlandicum), bog-rosemary (Andromeda glaucophylla), leather leaf (Chamaedaphne calyculata), and small cranberry (Vaccinium oxycoccos). Characteristically the herbaceous cover includes sedges (Carex spp.), cottongrass (Eriophorum spp.), three-leaved false Solomonseal (Maianthemum trifolium), marsh cinquefoil (Potentilla palustris), marsh-marigold (Caltha palustris), and bogbean (Menyanthes trifoliata). Ground cover is usually composed of sphagnum moss (Sphagnum spp.) and other mosses.

Seed cones and pollen cones 

Tamarack is monoecious. Male and female cones are small, either solitary or in groups of 2 or 3, and appear with the needles. Male cones are yellow and are borne mainly on 1- or 2-year-old branchlets. Female cones resemble tiny roses. They are reddish or maroon, have needles at their base which are shorter and bluer than the other needles on the tree. They are borne most commonly on 2 to 4-year-old branchlets, but may also appear on branchlets 5 or more years old. Cones usually are produced on young growth of vigorous trees. On open-grown trees, cones are borne on all parts of the crown.

Uses 

The wood is tough and durable, but also flexible in thin strips, and was used by the Algonquian people for making snowshoes and other products where toughness was required. The natural crooks located in the stumps and roots are also preferred for creating knees in wooden boats. Currently, the wood is used principally for pulpwood, but also for posts, poles, rough lumber, and fuelwood; it is not a major commercial timber species. Tamarack wood is also used as kickboards in horse stables.Older Log homes built in the 19th century sometimes incorporated tamarack along with other species like red or white oak. The hewn logs have a coarse grainy surface texture.

It is also grown as an ornamental tree in gardens in cold regions. Several dwarf cultivars have been created that are available commercially. Tamarack is commonly used for bonsai.

Tamarack poles were used in corduroy roads because of their resistance to rot. Tamarack posts were used before 1917 in Alberta to mark the northeast corner of sections surveyed within townships. They were used by the surveyors because at that time the very rot-resistant wood was readily available in the bush and was light to carry. Their rot resistance was also why they were often used in early water distribution systems.

The aboriginal peoples of Canada's northwest regions used the inner bark as a poultice to treat cuts, infected wounds, frostbite, boils and hemorrhoids. The outer bark and roots are also said to have been used with another plant as a treatment for arthritis, cold and general aches and pains.

Wildlife use the tree for food and nesting. Porcupines eat the inner bark, snowshoe hares feeds on tamarack seedlings, and red squirrels eat the seeds. Birds that frequent tamaracks during the summer include the white-throated sparrow, song sparrow, veery, common yellowthroat, and Nashville warbler.

Reaction to competition 

Tamarack is very intolerant of shade. Although it can tolerate some shade during the first several years, it must become dominant to survive. When mixed with other species, it must be in the over story. The tree is a good self-pruner, and boles of 25- to 30-year-old trees may be clear for one-half or two-thirds their length.

Because tamarack is very shade-intolerant, it does not become established in its own shade. Consequently, the more tolerant black spruce eventually succeeds tamarack on poor bog sites, whereas northern white-cedar, balsam fir, and swamp hardwoods succeed tamarack on good swamp sites. Recurring sawfly outbreaks throughout the range of tamarack have probably sped the usual succession to black spruce or other associates.

Various tests on planting and natural reproduction indicate that competing vegetation hinders tamarack establishment.

The shade-intolerance of tamarack dictates the use of even-aged management. Some adaptation of clear cutting or seed-tree cutting is generally considered the best silvicultural system because tamarack seeds apparently germinate better in the open, and the seedlings require practically full light to survive and grow well. Tamarack is also usually wind-firm enough for the seed-tree system to succeed. Satisfactory reestablishment of tamarack, however, often requires some kind of site preparation, such as slash disposal and herbicide spraying.

Damaging agents 

The tamarack has thin bark and is therefore highly susceptible to fire damage, except perhaps in older, upland stands. However, the habitat of tamarack, especially south of the boreal forest, is normally wet enough to protect the tree from fire. The tamarack is also susceptible to high winds. Strong winds can uproot large tamarack trees growing in swamps or other wet-land sites where rooting is shallow. It has also been discovered that abnormally high water levels often kill tamarack stands. Those that survive under such conditions usually grow very slowly. Other effects of high water include dieback and the development of adventitious roots and shoots. Wetland road crossings and beaver damming are the primary causes of flooding.

Many insect species are known to be destructive to tamaracks. The non-indigenous larch sawfly is the most destructive. Epidemics occur periodically across Canada and the northern United States and have caused tremendous losses of merchantable tamarack throughout most of the tree's range. Indications are that radial increment declines markedly after 4 to 6 years of outbreak. After 6 to 9 years of moderate to heavy defoliation, the trees die. In southeastern Manitoba and northern Minnesota, however, imported parasites of the sawfly have become established and should reduce the frequency and duration of future outbreaks. Another serious defoliator is the larch casebearer Coleophora laricella. The larch casebearer attacks tamarack of all ages, and several severe outbreaks have caused extensive mortality in some areas. Outbreak severity has lessened in recent years, however, probably due to imported parasites of the casebearer that have become widely established.

Only a few other insects and related organisms (such as mites) that feed on tamarack are known to sometimes cause serious injury. During an outbreak, the spruce budworm (Choristoneura fumiferana) can severely damage tamarack. The larch-bud moth (Zeiraphera improbana) has had occasional short epidemics, and the spruce spider mite (Oligonychus ununguis) is occasionally found in large numbers on tamarack. The larch-shoot moth (Argyresthia laricella) is widely distributed, but serious injury is unusual. One of the most common bark beetles attacking tamarack is the eastern larch beetle (Dendroctonus simplex), but it feeds mainly on weakened, dying, or dead trees.

Tamarack is a host to many pathogens, but only one cause diseases serious enough to have an economic impact on its culture, the Lachnellula willkommii fungus. It is a relatively new pathogen in Canada, first recorded in 1980 and originating in Europe. The fungus cause large cankers to form and a disease known as larch canker which is particularly harmful to the tamarack larch, killing both young and mature trees. Apart from this, the only common foliage diseases are rusts, such as the leaf rust in eastern and central North America. However, this rust, caused by the fungus Melampsora medusae, and other rusts do little damage to tamarack. The needle-cast fungus Hypodermella laricis has attacked tamarack in Ontario and has the potential for local damage.

Gallery

See also 
 Larch ball

References

External links 

 Larix laricina images at the Arnold Arboretum of Harvard University Plant Image Database
 Enzenbacher, Tiffany. "Plant Collecting in the Wisconsin Wilds". Arnold Arboretum of Harvard University website, 30 August 2017. Accessed 12 May 2020.
 Earl J. S. Rook, Boundary Waters Compendium, Flora, Fauna, Earth, and Sky, The Natural History of the Northwoods, Trees of the Northwoods, Larix laricina

laricina
Deciduous conifers
Least concern plants
Plants described in 1771
Trees of Eastern Canada
Trees of Subarctic America
Trees of the North-Central United States
Trees of the Northeastern United States
Trees of the Great Lakes region (North America)
Trees of Western Canada